Tincques is a commune in the Pas-de-Calais department in the Hauts-de-France region of France.

Geography

Population

Places of interest
 The church of St. Hilaire, dating from the seventeenth century.
 A chateau and a farmhouse, both dating from the seventeenth century.

See also
Communes of the Pas-de-Calais department

References

External links

 Official Tincques website

Communes of Pas-de-Calais